Estadio Romualdo Bueso is a football stadium in La Esperanza, Honduras.  It is currently used mostly for football matches and is the home stadium of Atlético Esperanzano and Lenca Rugby Club.  The stadium holds 3,000 people. 

Romualdo Bueso